Acra Point is a mountain in Greene County, New York. It is located in the Catskill Mountains south of South Durham. Burnt Knob is located west-northwest, and Blackhead is located south of Acra Point.

References

Mountains of Greene County, New York
Mountains of New York (state)